Nina Broznić (born 19 February 1991 in Rijeka) is a Croatian cross-country skier who has competed since 2007. She finished 52nd in the individual sprint event at the 2010 Winter Olympics in Vancouver.

Broznić has two victories in lesser events, both in sprints, in 2008 and 2009.

References
 

1991 births
Croatian female cross-country skiers
Cross-country skiers at the 2010 Winter Olympics
Living people
Olympic cross-country skiers of Croatia
Sportspeople from Rijeka